Ismael Torres (27 March 1952 – 21 October 2003) was an Argentine cyclist. He competed in the team pursuit event at the 1972 Summer Olympics.

References

External links
 

1952 births
2003 deaths
Argentine male cyclists
Olympic cyclists of Argentina
Cyclists at the 1972 Summer Olympics
Place of birth missing